The 2022 Ohio Valley Conference baseball tournament will be held from May 25 through 28.  The top eight regular season finishers will meet in the double-elimination tournament, to be held at Wild Health Field in Lexington, Kentucky.  The tournament champion will earn the conference's automatic bid to the 2022 NCAA Division I baseball tournament  Among current members, Austin Peay has won the most championships, with six, while Belmont (joined in 2012), SIU Edwardsville (joined in 2008), and UT Martin (joined in 1992) have never won championships.  The Tournament began in 1979.

Seeding and format
The top eight regular season finishers will be seeded by conference winning percentage.  The bottom six seeds will play a single elimination round, with the fifth and eighth seeds facing off while the sixth and seventh seeds play each other.  The winners will then play the third and fourth seeds, with the winners meeting the top two seeds in the double-elimination championship round. The final will be a winner-take-all game.

Results
Bracket A

Bracket B

Double-elimination round

References

Tournament
Ohio Valley Conference Baseball Tournament
Ohio Valley Conference baseball tournament